The 1985–86 Milwaukee Bucks season was the 18th season for the Bucks. Milwaukee posted a 57-25 record but lost to the Boston Celtics in the Eastern Conference Finals.

Draft picks

Roster

Regular season

Season standings

z – clinched division title
y – clinched division title
x – clinched playoff spot

Record vs. opponents

Game log

|- align="center" bgcolor="#ffcccc"
| 1
| October 25, 1985
| @ Detroit
| L 116–118
|
|
|
| Pontiac Silverdome
| 0–1
|- align="center" bgcolor="#ccffcc"
| 2
| October 26, 19858:00p.m. CDT
| Atlanta
| W 117–91
| Moncrief (20)
| Breuer (7)
| Pressey (7)
| MECCA Arena10,237
| 1–1
|- align="center" bgcolor="#ccffcc"
| 3
| October 29, 1985
| Philadelphia
| W 119–117
|
|
|
| MECCA Arena
| 2–1
|- align="center" bgcolor="#ffcccc"
| 4
| October 30, 1985
| @ Boston
| L 106–117
|
|
|
| Boston Garden
| 2–2

|- align="center" bgcolor="#ccffcc"
| 5
| November 2, 1985
| New Jersey
| W 136–113
|
|
|
| MECCA Arena
| 3–2
|- align="center" bgcolor="#ccffcc"
| 6
| November 3, 1985
| @ Cleveland
| W 120–110
|
|
|
| Richfield Coliseum
| 4–2
|- align="center" bgcolor="#ccffcc"
| 7
| November 5, 1985
| San Antonio
| W 126–97
|
|
|
| MECCA Arena
| 5–2
|- align="center" bgcolor="#ccffcc"
| 8
| November 7, 1985
| @ New York
| W 92–88
|
|
|
| Madison Square Garden
| 6–2
|- align="center" bgcolor="#ffcccc"
| 9
| November 9, 1985
| @ New Jersey
| L 123–126
|
|
|
| Brendan Byrne Arena
| 6–3
|- align="center" bgcolor="#ffcccc"
| 10
| November 10, 1985
| @ Philadelphia
| L 97–105
|
|
|
| The Spectrum
| 6–4
|- align="center" bgcolor="#ccffcc"
| 11
| November 12, 1985
| @ Chicago
| W 132–103
|
|
|
| Chicago Stadium
| 7–4
|- align="center" bgcolor="#ccffcc"
| 12
| November 13, 1985
| Detroit
| W 137–118
|
|
|
| MECCA Arena
| 8–4
|- align="center" bgcolor="#ccffcc"
| 13
| November 15, 1985
| Chicago
| W 118–103
|
|
|
| MECCA Arena
| 9–4
|- align="center" bgcolor="#ccffcc"
| 14
| November 17, 1985
| @ Portland
| W 117–104
|
|
|
| Memorial Coliseum
| 10–4
|- align="center" bgcolor="#ccffcc"
| 15
| November 20, 1985
| @ Seattle
| W 116–106
|
|
|
| Seattle Center Coliseum
| 11–4
|- align="center" bgcolor="#ccffcc"
| 16
| November 21, 1985
| @ Sacramento
| W 131–97
|
|
|
| ARCO Arena
| 12–4
|- align="center" bgcolor="#ffcccc"
| 17
| November 23, 1985
| @ L.A. Clippers
| L 112–116
|
|
|
| Los Angeles Memorial Sports Arena
| 12–5
|- align="center" bgcolor="#ccffcc"
| 18
| November 24, 1985
| @ Phoenix
| W 140–138 (OT)
|
|
|
| Arizona Veterans Memorial Coliseum
| 13–5
|- align="center" bgcolor="#ccffcc"
| 19
| November 27, 19857:30p.m. CST
| Atlanta
| W 114–96
| Cummings (19)
| Cummings (9)
| Pressey (8)
| MECCA Arena10,879
| 14–5
|- align="center" bgcolor="#ffcccc"
| 20
| November 29, 1985
| @ Detroit
| L 102–111
|
|
|
| Pontiac Silverdome
| 14–6
|- align="center" bgcolor="#ccffcc"
| 21
| November 30, 1985
| Indiana
| W 111–94
|
|
|
| MECCA Arena
| 15–6

|- align="center" bgcolor="#ffcccc"
| 22
| December 3, 1985
| Boston
| L 109–112
|
|
|
| MECCA Arena
| 15–7
|- align="center" bgcolor="#ccffcc"
| 23
| December 5, 1985
| @ New York
| W 105–95
|
|
|
| Madison Square Garden
| 16–7
|- align="center" bgcolor="#ffcccc"
| 24
| December 6, 19856:30p.m. CST
| @ Atlanta
| L 93–94
| Moncrief (23)
| Cummings (13)
| Hodges, Pressey (4)
| The Omni5,562
| 16–8
|- align="center" bgcolor="#ccffcc"
| 25
| December 10, 1985
| Seattle
| W 117–98
|
|
|
| MECCA Arena
| 17–8
|- align="center" bgcolor="#ffcccc"
| 26
| December 12, 1985
| @ Washington
| L 108–110 (OT)
|
|
|
| Capital Centre
| 17–9
|- align="center" bgcolor="#ffcccc"
| 27
| December 13, 1985
| Cleveland
| L 124–128
|
|
|
| MECCA Arena
| 17–10
|- align="center" bgcolor="#ccffcc"
| 28
| December 15, 1985
| Sacramento
| W 140–82
|
|
|
| MECCA Arena
| 18–10
|- align="center" bgcolor="#ffcccc"
| 29
| December 18, 1985
| L.A. Lakers
| L 105–107
|
|
|
| MECCA Arena
| 18–11
|- align="center" bgcolor="#ffcccc"
| 30
| December 20, 1985
| @ Indiana
| L 102–114
|
|
|
| Market Square Arena
| 19–11
|- align="center" bgcolor="#ccffcc"
| 31
| December 21, 1985
| Dallas
| W 132–107
|
|
|
| MECCA Arena
| 19–12
|- align="center" bgcolor="#ccffcc"
| 32
| December 26, 1985
| Indiana
| W 105–87
|
|
|
| MECCA Arena
| 20–12
|- align="center" bgcolor="#ccffcc"
| 33
| December 28, 1985
| @ Cleveland
| W 114–112 (OT)
|
|
|
| Richfield Coliseum
| 21–12
|- align="center" bgcolor="#ccffcc"
| 34
| December 30, 1985
| Detroit
| W 121–110
|
|
|
| MECCA Arena
| 22–12

|- align="center" bgcolor="#ccffcc"
| 35
| January 3, 1986
| @ Washington
| W 107–100
|
|
|
| Capital Centre
| 23–12
|- align="center" bgcolor="#ccffcc"
| 36
| January 4, 1986
| New York
| W 119–86
|
|
|
| MECCA Arena
| 23–13
|- align="center" bgcolor="#ccffcc"
| 37
| January 7, 1986
| Cleveland
| W 110–101
|
|
|
| MECCA Arena
| 24–13
|- align="center" bgcolor="#ffcccc"
| 38
| January 8, 1986
| @ New Jersey
| L 99–106
|
|
|
| Brendan Byrne Arena
| 25–13
|- align="center" bgcolor="#ccffcc"
| 39
| January 10, 1986
| Portland
| W 95–89
|
|
|
| MECCA Arena
| 26–13
|- align="center" bgcolor="#ffcccc"
| 40
| January 13, 1986
| Denver
| L 115–119
|
|
|
| MECCA Arena
| 26–14
|- align="center" bgcolor="#ccffcc"
| 41
| January 16, 1986
| Washington
| W 114–98
|
|
|
| MECCA Arena
| 27–14
|- align="center" bgcolor="#ccffcc"
| 42
| January 19, 1986
| Golden State
| W 122–109
|
|
|
| MECCA Arena
| 28–14
|- align="center" bgcolor="#ffcccc"
| 43
| January 20, 19866:30p.m. CST
| @ Atlanta
| L 98–101
| Moncrief, Pressey (23)
| Breuer (14)
| Moncrief (7)
| The Omni9,467
| 28–15
|- align="center" bgcolor="#ccffcc"
| 44
| January 24, 1986
| @ Indiana
| W 117–92
|
|
|
| Market Square Arena
| 29–15
|- align="center" bgcolor="#ccffcc"
| 45
| January 25, 1986
| @ New York
| W 104–88
|
|
|
| Madison Square Garden
| 30–15
|- align="center" bgcolor="#ccffcc"
| 46
| January 27, 1986
| @ Utah
| W 127–103
|
|
|
| Salt Palace Acord Arena
| 31–15
|- align="center" bgcolor="#ffcccc"
| 47
| January 28, 1986
| @ L.A. Lakers
| L 115–125
|
|
|
| The Forum
| 31–16
|- align="center" bgcolor="#ccffcc"
| 48
| January 30, 1986
| @ Golden State
| W 120–108
|
|
|
| Oakland-Alameda County Coliseum Arena
| 32–16

|- align="center" bgcolor="#ffcccc"
| 49
| February 1, 1986
| @ Denver
| L 113–116
|
|
|
| McNichols Sports Arena
| 32–17
|- align="center" bgcolor="#ffcccc"
| 50
| February 4, 1986
| Boston
| L 93–112
|
|
|
| MECCA Arena
| 32–18
|- align="center" bgcolor="#ccffcc"
| 51
| February 6, 1986
| Chicago
| W 117–97
|
|
|
| MECCA Arena
| 33–18
|- align="center"
|colspan="9" bgcolor="#bbcaff"|All-Star Break
|- style="background:#cfc;"
|- bgcolor="#bbffbb"
|- align="center" bgcolor="#ccffcc"
| 52
| February 12, 1986
| @ Indiana
| W 103–97
|
|
|
| Market Square Arena
| 34–18
|- align="center" bgcolor="#ccffcc"
| 53
| February 13, 1986
| Utah
| W 113–106
|
|
|
| MECCA Arena
| 35–18
|- align="center" bgcolor="#ccffcc"
| 54
| February 15, 1986
| New Jersey
| W 112–94
|
|
|
| MECCA Arena
| 36–18
|- align="center" bgcolor="#ccffcc"
| 55
| February 17, 1986
| @ Philadelphia
| W 111–106
|
|
|
| The Spectrum
| 37–18
|- align="center" bgcolor="#ccffcc"
| 56
| February 19, 1986
| @ Dallas
| W 124–107
|
|
|
| Reunion Arena
| 38–18
|- align="center" bgcolor="#ccffcc"
| 57
| February 20, 1986
| @ Houston
| W 120–113
|
|
|
| The Summit
| 39–18
|- align="center" bgcolor="#ccffcc"
| 58
| February 22, 1986
| @ San Antonio
| W 120–115
|
|
|
| HemisFair Arena
| 40–18
|- align="center" bgcolor="#ccffcc"
| 59
| February 25, 1986
| L.A. Clippers
| W 114–99
|
|
|
| MECCA Arena
| 41–18
|- align="center" bgcolor="#ccffcc"
| 60
| February 28, 1986
| Washington
| W 102–84
|
|
|
| MECCA Arena
| 42–18

|- align="center" bgcolor="#ffcccc"
| 61
| March 2, 1986
| @ Washington
| L 104–125
|
|
|
| Capital Centre
| 42–19
|- align="center" bgcolor="#ccffcc"
| 62
| March 3, 1986
| New York
| W 115–108
|
|
|
| MECCA Arena
| 43–19
|- align="center" bgcolor="#ccffcc"
| 63
| March 5, 1986
| @ New Jersey
| W 119–106
|
|
|
| Brendan Byrne Arena
| 44–19
|- align="center" bgcolor="#ccffcc"
| 64
| March 7, 1986
| Philadelphia
| W 125–95
|
|
|
| MECCA Arena
| 45–19
|- align="center" bgcolor="#ffcccc"
| 65
| March 8, 19866:30p.m. CST
| @ Atlanta
| L 109–111
| Pressey (30)
| Lister (10)
| Hodges (5)
| The Omni15,822
| 45–20
|- align="center" bgcolor="#ffcccc"
| 66
| March 12, 1986
| Phoenix
| L 126–127 (OT)
|
|
|
| MECCA Arena
| 45–21
|- align="center" bgcolor="#ffcccc"
| 67
| March 14, 1986
| Indiana
| L 104–114
|
|
|
| MECCA Arena
| 45–22
|- align="center" bgcolor="#ccffcc"
| 68
| March 15, 1986
| @ Chicago
| W 125–116 (OT)
|
|
|
| Chicago Stadium
| 46–22
|- align="center" bgcolor="#ccffcc"
| 69
| March 18, 1986
| Washington
| W 116–87
|
|
|
| MECCA Arena
| 47–22
|- align="center" bgcolor="#ccffcc"
| 70
| March 20, 1986
| Houston
| W 116–106
|
|
|
| MECCA Arena
| 48–22
|- align="center" bgcolor="#ccffcc"
| 71
| March 22, 19868:00p.m. CST
| Atlanta
| W 113–98
| Lister (18)
| Cummings (9)
| Pressey (8)
| MECCA Arena11,052
| 48–23
|- align="center" bgcolor="#ccffcc"
| 72
| March 25, 1986
| New Jersey
| W 118–105
|
|
|
| MECCA Arena
| 49–23
|- align="center" bgcolor="#ffcccc"
| 73
| March 26, 1986
| @ Boston
| L 115–121
|
|
|
| Boston Garden
| 50–23
|- align="center" bgcolor="#ccffcc"
| 74
| March 28, 1986
| @ Philadelphia
| W 116–94
|
|
|
| The Spectrum
| 51–23
|- align="center" bgcolor="#ccffcc"
| 75
| March 29, 1986
| Detroit
| W 130–121
|
|
|
| MECCA Arena
| 52–23

|- align="center" bgcolor="#ccffcc"
| 76
| April 1, 1986
| Chicago
| W 116–107
|
|
|
| MECCA Arena
| 53–23
|- align="center" bgcolor="#ccffcc"
| 77
| April 3, 1986
| Cleveland
| W 114–93
|
|
|
| MECCA Arena
| 54–23
|- align="center" bgcolor="#ccffcc"
| 78
| April 4, 1986
| @ Detroit
| W 115–108
|
|
|
| Pontiac Silverdome
| 55–23
|- align="center" bgcolor="#ffcccc"
| 79
| April 7, 1986
| @ Chicago
| L 101–107
|
|
|
| Chicago Stadium
| 55–24
|- align="center" bgcolor="#ffcccc"
| 80
| April 8, 1986
| Boston
| L 114–126
|
|
|
| MECCA Arena
| 55–25
|- align="center" bgcolor="#ccffcc"
| 81
| April 10, 1986
| @ Cleveland
| W 102–101
|
|
|
| Richfield Coliseum
| 56–25
|- align="center" bgcolor="#ccffcc"
| 82
| April 12, 1986
| New York
| W 116–78
|
|
|
| MECCA Arena
| 57–25

Playoffs

|- align="center" bgcolor="#ccffcc"
| 1
| April 18, 1986
| New Jersey
| W 119–107
| Craig Hodges (25)
| Alton Lister (10)
| Paul Pressey (10)
| MECCA Arena11,052
| 1–0
|- align="center" bgcolor="#ccffcc"
| 2
| April 20, 1986
| New Jersey
| W 111–97
| Terry Cummings (28)
| Terry Cummings (7)
| Paul Pressey (7)
| MECCA Arena11,052
| 2–0
|- align="center" bgcolor="#ccffcc"
| 3
| April 22, 1986
| @ New Jersey
| W 118–113
| Terry Cummings (23)
| Terry Cummings (11)
| Sidney Moncrief (5)
| Brendan Byrne Arena7,784
| 3–0
|-

|- align="center" bgcolor="#ffcccc"
| 1
| April 29, 1986
| Philadelphia
| L 112–118
| Terry Cummings (23)
| Terry Cummings (7)
| Paul Pressey (13)
| MECCA Arena11,052
| 0–1
|- align="center" bgcolor="#ccffcc"
| 2
| May 1, 1986
| Philadelphia
| W 119–107
| Terry Cummings (30)
| Terry Cummings (15)
| Paul Pressey (7)
| MECCA Arena11,052
| 1–1
|- align="center" bgcolor="#ffcccc"
| 3
| May 3, 1986
| @ Philadelphia
| L 103–107
| Terry Cummings (27)
| Cummings, Lister (9)
| Paul Pressey (9)
| The Spectrum14,611
| 1–2
|- align="center" bgcolor="#ccffcc"
| 4
| May 5, 1986
| @ Philadelphia
| W 109–104
| Cummings, Pierce (19)
| Terry Cummings (13)
| three players tied (4)
| The Spectrum17,941
| 2–2
|- align="center" bgcolor="#ccffcc"
| 5
| May 7, 1986
| Philadelphia
| W 113–108
| Pressey, Cummings (23)
| Terry Cummings (11)
| Paul Pressey (16)
| MECCA Arena11,052
| 3–2
|- align="center" bgcolor="#ffcccc"
| 6
| May 9, 1986
| @ Philadelphia
| L 108–126
| Craig Hodges (22)
| Alton Lister (10)
| Terry Cummings (5)
| The Spectrum15,287
| 3–3
|- align="center" bgcolor="#ccffcc"
| 7
| May 11, 1986
| Philadelphia
| W 113–112
| Terry Cummings (27)
| Terry Cummings (8)
| Paul Pressey (15)
| MECCA Arena11,052
| 4–3
|-

|- align="center" bgcolor="#ffcccc"
| 1
| May 13, 1986
| @ Boston
| L 96–128
| Kenny Fields (18)
| Terry Cummings (11)
| three players tied (3)
| Boston Garden14,890
| 0–1
|- align="center" bgcolor="#ffcccc"
| 2
| May 15, 1986
| @ Boston
| L 111–122
| Terry Cummings (23)
| Alton Lister (7)
| Paul Pressey (9)
| Boston Garden14,890
| 0–2
|- align="center" bgcolor="#ffcccc"
| 3
| May 17, 1986
| Boston
| L 107–111
| Terry Cummings (27)
| Terry Cummings (18)
| Paul Pressey (9)
| MECCA Arena11,052
| 0–3
|- align="center" bgcolor="#ffcccc"
| 4
| May 18, 1986
| Boston
| L 98–111
| Sidney Moncrief (27)
| Alton Lister (12)
| Sidney Moncrief (8)
| MECCA Arena11,052
| 0–4
|-

Player statistics
Source:

Season

Playoffs

Awards and Records
 Sidney Moncrief, All-NBA Second Team
 Sidney Moncrief, NBA All-Defensive First Team
 Paul Pressey, NBA All-Defensive First Team

Transactions

Trades

Free agents

References

 Bucks on Database Basketball
 Bucks on Basketball Reference

Milwaukee Bucks seasons
Milwaukee Bucks
Milwaukee Bucks
Milwaukee Bucks